DWGL (104.5 FM), broadcasting as 104.5 Radyo Natin, is a community radio station owned and operated by Manila Broadcasting Company. The station's studio and transmitter are located at Dumlao Boulevard, Brgy. Don Domingo Maddela Poblacion, Bayombong.

References

Radio stations established in 2012
Radio stations in Nueva Vizcaya